Otidea bufonia is a species of apothecial fungus belonging to the family Pyronemataceae. This is a rare European species occurring singly or in small groups on soil in woodland.

References

External links

Fungi described in 1822
Pyronemataceae
Taxa named by Christiaan Hendrik Persoon